The Flag Tower of Hanoi is a tower in Hanoi, Vietnam, which is one of the symbols of the city and once a part of the Hanoi Citadel, a World Heritage Site. Its height is 33.4 m (41 m with the flag).

History 
The tower was built in 1812 during the Nguyen dynasty as an observation post to the Hanoi Citadel. Unlike many other structures in Hanoi, it was not destroyed during the French invasion (1896-1897), and was continuously used as a military post. It is now located in the Vietnam Military History Museum.

Architecture 

Cột cờ is composed of three tiers and a pyramid-shaped tower with a spiral staircase leading to the top inside it. The first tier is 42.5 m wide and 3.1 m high; the second - 25 m wide and 3.7 m high and the third - 12.8 m wide and 5.1 m high. The second tier has four doors. The words "Nghênh Húc" (English: "To welcome dawn's sunlight") are inscribed on the eastern door; the words "Hồi Quang" ("To reflect light") - on the western door and "Hướng Minh" ("Directed to the sunlight") - on the southern door. The tower is lighted by 36 flower-shaped and 6 fan-shaped windows. The National Flag of Vietnam is on top of the tower.

See also
Tower of Hanoi

External links

A description of the tower
A photo of the tower
Satellite photo at Google Maps

Towers completed in 1812
Flag Tower
Buildings and structures in Hanoi
Historical sites in Hanoi